|}
{| class="collapsible collapsed" cellpadding="0" cellspacing="0" style="clear:right; float:right; text-align:center; font-weight:bold;" width="280px"
! colspan="3" style="border:1px solid black; background-color: #77DD77;" | Also Ran

The 1991 Epsom Derby was a horse race which took place at Epsom Downs on Wednesday 5 June 1991. It was the 212th running of the Derby, and it was won by Generous. The winner was ridden by Alan Munro and trained by Paul Cole. The pre-race joint favourites were Corrupt (sixth) and Toulon (ninth).

Race details
 Sponsor: Ever Ready
 Winner's prize money: £355,000
 Going: Good to Firm
 Number of runners: 13
 Winner's time: 2m 34.00s

Full result

* The distances between the horses are shown in lengths or shorter. shd = short-head.† Trainers are based in Great Britain unless indicated.

Winner's details
Further details of the winner, Generous:

 Foaled: 8 February 1988, in Ireland
 Sire: Caerleon; Dam: Doff the Derby (Master Derby)
 Owner: Prince Fahd bin Salman
 Breeder: Barronstown Stud
 Rating in 1991 International Classifications: 137

Form analysis

Two-year-old races
Notable runs by the future Derby participants as two-year-olds in 1990.

 Generous – 2nd Coventry Stakes, 3rd Vintage Stakes, 10th Prix Morny, 1st Dewhurst Stakes
 Star of Gdansk – 3rd Tyros Stakes, 2nd Futurity Stakes
 Hector Protector – 1st Prix La Flèche, 1st Prix de Cabourg, 1st Prix Morny, 1st Prix de la Salamandre, 1st Grand Critérium
 Corrupt – 4th Bernard van Cutsem Stakes, 5th Vintage Stakes
 Hokusai – 1st Bernard van Cutsem Stakes
 Hailsham – 7th Coventry Stakes, 7th Solario Stakes, 4th Royal Lodge Stakes
 Mystiko  – 3rd Gimcrack Stakes
 Arokat – 2nd Champagne Stakes
 Mujaazif – 1st Royal Lodge Stakes, 4th Racing Post Trophy

The road to Epsom
Early-season appearances in 1991 and trial races prior to running in the Derby.

 Generous – 4th 2,000 Guineas
 Marju – 1st Craven Stakes, 11th 2,000 Guineas
 Star of Gdansk – 1st Tetrarch Stakes, 2nd Amethyst Stakes, 2nd Irish 2,000 Guineas
 Hector Protector – 1st Prix de Fontainebleau, 1st Poule d'Essai des Poulains
 Hundra – 1st Dee Stakes
 Corrupt – 1st Easter Stakes, 1st Lingfield Derby Trial
 Hokusai – 3rd Craven Stakes, 8th 2,000 Guineas, 4th Prix Jean Prat
 Hailsham – 4th Craven Stakes, 1st Sandown Classic Trial, 2nd Dante Stakes, 1st Derby Italiano
 Toulon – 3rd Prix Greffulhe, 1st Chester Vase
 Mystiko  – 1st European Free Handicap, 1st 2,000 Guineas
 Environment Friend – 3rd Easter Stakes, 5th Craven Stakes, 1st Dante Stakes
 Arokat – 5th Feilden Stakes, 3rd Dee Stakes
 Mujaazif – 13th 2,000 Guineas

Subsequent Group 1 wins
Group 1 / Grade I victories after running in the Derby.

 Generous – Irish Derby (1991), King George VI and Queen Elizabeth Stakes (1991)
 Marju – St. James's Palace Stakes (1991)
 Hector Protector – Prix Jacques Le Marois (1991)
 Toulon – St. Leger (1991)
 Environment Friend – Eclipse Stakes (1991)

Subsequent breeding careers
Leading progeny of participants in the 1991 Epsom Derby.

Sires of Classic winners
Generous (1st)
 Mystic Lips - 1st Preis der Diana (2007)
 Bahr - 2nd Epsom Oaks (1998)
 Highland Gift - Dam of Golan and Tartan Bearer
 Copeland - 1st Scottish Champion Hurdle (2004)
Marju (2nd)
 Sil Sila - 1st Prix de Diane (1996)
 Bethrah - 1st Irish 1,000 Guineas (2010)
 Soviet Song - Champion Older Horse (2004)
 Mrs Marsh - Dam of Canford Cliffs

Sires of Group/Grade One winners
Hector Protector (1st)
 Shiva - 1st Tattersalls Gold Cup (1999)
 Vanquished - 3rd The Metropolitan (2006)
 Limnos - 1st Prix Foy (1998)
 Shanty Star - 1st Queen's Vase (2003)

Sires of National Hunt horses
Toulon (9th)
 Kingscliff - 1st Betfair Chase (2005)
 Solerina - 1st Hatton's Grace Hurdle (2003, 2004, 2005)
 Too Forward - 1st River Don Novices' Hurdle (2002)
 Xenophon - 1st Coral Cup (2003)

Other Stallions
Environment Friend (11th) - Alfa Beat (1st Kerry National 2010, 2011)Corrupt (6th) - Exported to New ZealandHailsham (8th) - Exported to JapanMystiko (10th) - Minor flat and jumps winnersMujaazif (13th) - Exported to South Korea

References

External links
 Colour Chart – Derby 1991

Epsom Derby
 1991
Epsom Derby
20th century in Surrey
Epsom Derby